Hutisko-Solanec is a municipality in Vsetín District in the Zlín Region of the Czech Republic. It has about 2,000 inhabitants.

Administrative parts
The municipality is made up of villages of Hutisko and Solanec pod Soláněm.

Etymology
The name of Hutisko refers to glassworks (hutě), which was founded here in the early 17th century. The settlement of Solanec was named after the nearby Soláň Hill.

Geography

The northern part of the municipality with Hutisko is located in the Rožnov Furrow, the southern part with Solanec pod Soláněm is located in the Moravian-Silesian Beskids. The entire municipality lies in the Beskydy Protected Landscape Area.

History
The settlement of Hutisko was founded by Baltazar of Zierotin in 1656. The settlement of Solanec became a municipality in 1657, Hutisko in 1666. Hutisko and Solanec pod Soláněm were merged into one municipality in 1960.

Sights
In the municipality there is a monument to Charlotte Garrigue, built in 1926 by the managing teacher Cyril Mach.

Twin towns – sister cities

Hutisko-Solanec is twinned with:
 Makov, Slovakia

References

External links

Villages in Vsetín District
Moravian Wallachia